Euphaedra caerulescens is a butterfly in the family Nymphalidae. It is found in the Central African Republic, the Democratic Republic of the Congo, Uganda and possibly Ethiopia.

Description
Very close to Euphaedra xypete qv.

Subspecies
Euphaedra caerulescens caerulescens (southern Central African Republic, northern Democratic Republic of the Congo, western Uganda: Semuliki National Park)
Euphaedra caerulescens caliginosa Hecq, 2004 (Central African Republic)
Euphaedra caerulescens submarginalis Hecq, 1997 (Ethiopia)

References

Butterflies described in 1890
caerulescens
Butterflies of Africa